Dan Labraaten (born September 5, 1951) is a Swedish former professional ice hockey player and scout who played 268 games in the National Hockey League and 111 games in the World Hockey Association between 1976 and 1982. He played for the Calgary Flames, Detroit Red Wings, and Winnipeg Jets. He also played in the Swedish Division I and Eliterien from 1969 to 1976 and again from 1982 to 1988. Internationally, he played for Swedish national team at several international tournaments, including six World Championships, winning one silver and four bronze medals.

Career statistics

Regular season and playoffs

International

References

External links
 

1951 births
Living people
Calgary Flames players
Detroit Red Wings players
Leksands IF players
New Jersey Devils scouts
People from Arvika Municipality
Sportspeople from Värmland County
Swedish ice hockey left wingers
Undrafted National Hockey League players
Vegas Golden Knights scouts
Winnipeg Jets (WHA) players